Libellago lineata, river heliodor is a species of damselfly in the family Chlorocyphidae. It is found in many Asian countries.

The species is found in clear streams or rivers.

Subspecies
Three have been named:
 L. lineata andamanensis (Fraser 1924) - Andaman and Nicobar Islands
 L. lineata indica (Fraser, 1928) - South India
 L. lineata lineata (Burmeister, 1839) - Southeast Asia, Northeast India

The subspecies Libellago lineata andamanensis and L. lineata indica are now generally considered as new species, Libellago andamanensis and Libellago indica.

See also
 List of odonates of India
 List of odonates of Sri Lanka

References

External links 
 http://animaldiversity.org/accounts/Libellago_lineata/classification/
 http://slendemics.net/easl/invertibrates/Dragonflyies/dragonflies.html
 https://web.archive.org/web/20150219172210/http://www.wht.lk/storage/book_downloads/CorrigendaAddendum.pdf
 http://www.wildreach.com/reptile/animals/dragonflies.php

Endemic fauna of Sri Lanka
Insects of Sri Lanka
Insects described in 1839
Chlorocyphidae